The Mineral Springs Waterworks is a historic site located in Mineral Springs, Arkansas. It contains a good example of a 1930s-era elevated steel water tower, built in 1936 by the Pittsburgh-Des Moines Steel Company in conjunction with the Public Works Administration as part of a project to improve the town's water supply. The tower was built to store water obtained from a nearby well. It was added to the National Register of Historic Places in 2007, as part of a multiple-property listing that included numerous other New Deal-era projects throughout Arkansas. A new water well was drilled nearby in 1985; however, the original water tower still stands. The Mineral Springs Waterworks remains in operation.

See also
Cotter Water Tower
Cotton Plant Water Tower
Hampton Waterworks
Hartford Water Tower
National Register of Historic Places listings in Howard County, Arkansas

References

External links
An Ambition to be Preferred: New Deal Recovery Efforts and Architecture in Arkansas, 1933-1943, By Holly Hope

Industrial buildings and structures on the National Register of Historic Places in Arkansas
Water supply infrastructure on the National Register of Historic Places
Public Works Administration in Arkansas
National Register of Historic Places in Howard County, Arkansas
Water towers on the National Register of Historic Places in Arkansas
1936 establishments in Arkansas
Infrastructure completed in 1936